Miidera was a Noh play centred around a mad woman, and her search for her son at the temple complex of Mii-dera near Kyoto.

Plot
Driven mad by the loss of her young son, possibly abducted as a boy prostitute, the heroine is urged in a dream to seek him at Miidera temple. There the woman is much impressed by the temple bell, and recounts a long list of episodes involving temple bells.  

When she finally draws attention to herself by striking the bell, she is recognised by and reunited with her son - the aesthete Oswald Valentine Sickert considering that "The sounding of the bell is the hinge of everything, a thing of great sentiment".

Literary links
An early haiku quotes the play: "Hey there, wait a moment / before you strike the bell /at the cherry blossoms".

See also
Kagema
Kannon
Nāga

References 

Noh
Noh plays